Raúl Arellano may refer to:

 Raúl Arellano (footballer, born 1935) (1935–1997), Mexican football forward
 Raúl Arellano (footballer, born 1939), Mexican football forward